Thomas William Bennett (April 7, 1947 – February 11, 1969) was a United States Army medic who was killed in action during the Vietnam War and the second conscientious objector to receive the Medal of Honor.

Bennett received the medal after repeatedly putting himself in harm's way to save wounded soldiers during operations in the Central Highlands of Vietnam. He was mortally wounded during one of these actions in Pleiku Province, and received the Medal of Honor posthumously.

Biography
Born in Morgantown, West Virginia, Thomas W. Bennett was sociable and deeply religious. He was raised Southern Baptist, but while a student at West Virginia University, he formed the Campus Ecumenical Council during his freshman year.

When he was placed on academic probation after the Fall 1967 semester, he considered his options should he lose his academic deferment. Deeply patriotic, but opposed to killing on religious grounds, he opted to enlist as a conscientious objector who was willing to serve. This classification is different from a conscientious objector who will not assist the military in any way. He was trained as a field medic.

Bennett arrived in South Vietnam on January 1, 1969, and was assigned to Bravo Company, 1st Battalion, 14th Infantry in the Central Highlands of Vietnam. The unit began a series of strenuous patrols in the dense, mountainous terrain. On February 9, 1969, the unit came under intense fire, and Bennett risked gunfire to pull at least five wounded men to safety. That evening, his platoon sergeant recommended him for the Silver Star. Over the coming days, Bennett repeatedly put himself in harm's way to tend to the wounded. On February 11, while attempting to reach a soldier wounded by sniper fire, Bennett was gunned down. On April 7, 1970, his posthumous Medal of Honor was presented to his mother and stepfather by President Richard Nixon.

In 1988 a center for young people at Schofield Barracks on Oahu, Hawaii, was named for Bennett. A bridge carrying Interstate 79 over the Monongahela River in Morgantown, WV is named in his honor. At West Virginia University's Evansdale Residential Complex, the Bennett Tower residence hall is named in his honor. A medical clinic at Fort Hood, Texas is named in his honor. He is the subject of Peaceful Patriot: the Story of Tom Bennett by Bonni McKeown.

Medal of Honor citation 
Rank and organization: Corporal, United States Army, 2nd Platoon, Company B, 1st Battalion, 14th Infantry Regiment.

Place and date: Chu Pah Region, Pleiku Province, Republic of Vietnam, 9–11 February 1969

Entered service at: Fairmont, West Virginia

Birth: Morgantown, West Virginia Born: 7 April 1947

Citation

See also

 List of Medal of Honor recipients
 List of Medal of Honor recipients for the Vietnam War
 Desmond Doss – first combat medic to receive the Medal of Honor (World War II)
 Harold A. Garman
 Joseph G. LaPointe Jr.
 Gary M. Rose

References

Notes

External links
West Virginia & Regional History Center at West Virginia University, Thomas W. Bennett papers
 

1947 births
1969 deaths
American conscientious objectors
Military personnel from Morgantown, West Virginia
American military personnel killed in the Vietnam War
United States Army Medal of Honor recipients
Conscientious objector Medal of Honor recipients
Morgantown High School alumni
United States Army non-commissioned officers
Combat medics
Vietnam War recipients of the Medal of Honor
West Virginia University alumni
United States Army personnel of the Vietnam War